Cratoxylum cochinchinense (or Cratoxylon cochinsinensis (Lour.) Blume, an orthographic variant often still used in Vietnam, where the species was described) is a plant now placed in the family Hypericaceae. The specific epithet  is from the Latin meaning "of Cochinchina".  In Vietnamese C. cochinchinense is usually called thành ngạch nam or lành ngạnh nam, other names include: hoàng ngưu mộc, hoàng ngưu trà and đỏ ngọn.

In Malesia  the trees are cut for derum timber.

Description
The brown bark is smooth to flaky, with characteristic lateral pegs which are the remnants of previous leaf clusters (see illustration); leaf undersides are glaucous.

Distribution and habitat
Cratoxylum cochinchinense grows naturally from southern China to Borneo. Its habitat is sub-tropical and tropical forests, including kerangas forests and peat swamps.

Gallery

References

External links 

cochinchinense
Flora of China
Flora of Indo-China
Flora of Vietnam
Flora of Malesia
Taxonomy articles created by Polbot
Flora of the Sundaland heath forests